Tula is a town located in Tula Municipality in the state of Tamaulipas.

History
The city was founded on 22 July 1617 by the Franciscan friar Juan Baptist of Mollinedo thus usually is considered the oldest city in the state of Tamaulipas.

In 2011, Tula was declared a pueblo mágico. In August 2013, archeologists discovered 30 skeletons estimated to be about 3,000 years old. This could mean that the area of Tula was home to one of oldest genetic lineages of America.

Climate

References

External links
Gobierno Municipal de Tula Official website

Populated places in Tamaulipas
Pueblos Mágicos
Populated places established in 1617